Gordon Matta-Clark (born Gordon Roberto Matta-Echaurren; June 22, 1943 – August 27, 1978) was an American artist best known for site-specific artworks he made in the 1970s.  He was also a pioneer in the field of socially engaged food art.

Life and work

Matta-Clark's parents were artists: Anne Clark, an American artist, and Roberto Matta, a Chilean Surrealist painter, of Basque, French and Spanish descent. He was the godson of Marcel Duchamp's wife, Teeny. His twin brother Sebastian, also an artist, died by suicide in 1976.

He studied architecture at Cornell University from 1962 to 1968, including a year at the Sorbonne in Paris, where he studied French literature. In 1971, he changed his name to Gordon Matta-Clark, adopting his mother's last name. He did not practice as a conventional architect; he worked on what he referred to as "Anarchitecture". At the time of Matta-Clark's tenure there, Cornell's architecture program was guided in part by Colin Rowe, a preeminent architectural theorist of modernism.

Matta-Clark used a number of media to document his work, including film, video, and photography. His work includes performance and recycling pieces, space and texture works, and his "building cuts". He also used puns and other word games as a way to re-conceptualize preconditioned roles and relationships (of everything, from people to architecture). 

In February, 1969, the "Earth Art" show, curated by Willoughby Sharp at the invitation of Tom Leavitt, was realized at Andrew Dickson White Museum of Art, Cornell University. Matta-Clark, who lived in Ithaca at the time, was invited by Sharp to help the artists in "Earth Art" with the on-site execution of their works for the exhibition. Sharp then encouraged Gordon Matta-Clark to move to New York City where Sharp continued to introduce him to members of the New York art world. Matta-Clark's work, Museum, at Klaus Kertess' Bykert Gallery, was listed and illustrated on pages 4–5 of Avalanche 1, Fall 1970.

In 1971 Matta-Clark, Carol Goodden, and Tina Girouard co-founded FOOD, a restaurant in Manhattan's Soho neighborhood; managed and staffed by artists. The restaurant turned dining into an event with an open kitchen and exotic ingredients that celebrated cooking. The activities at FOOD helped delineate how the art community defined itself in downtown Manhattan. The first of its kind in SoHo, Food became well known among artists and was a central meeting-place for groups such as the Philip Glass Ensemble, Mabou Mines, and the dancers of Grand Union. He ran FOOD until 1973.

In the early 1970s and in the context of his artistic community surrounding FOOD, Matta-Clark developed the idea of "anarchitecture" - a conflation of the words anarchy and architecture - to suggest an interest in voids, gaps, and left-over spaces. With his project Fake Estates, Matta-Clark addressed these issues of non-sites by purchasing at auction 15 leftover and unusably small slivers of land in Queens and Staten Island, New York, for $25–$75 a plot. He documented them through photographs, maps, bureaucratic records and deeds, and spoke and wrote about them - but was not able to occupy these residual elements of zoning irregularities in any other way.

In 1974, he performed a literal deconstruction, by removing the facade of a condemned house along the Love Canal, and moving the resulting walls to Artpark, in his work Bingo.

For the Biennale de Paris in 1975, he made the piece titled Conical Intersect by cutting a large cone-shaped hole through two townhouses dating from the 17th century in the market district known as Les Halles which were to be knocked down in order to construct the then-controversial Centre Georges Pompidou.  Also in 1975 he did a similar art intervention named "Days End, Conical Inversion" by cutting a round aperture into the structure at Pier 52 on the Hudson River in Manhattan.

For his final major project, Circus or The Caribbean Orange (1978), Matta-Clark made circle cuts in the walls and floors of a townhouse next-door to the first Museum of Contemporary Art, Chicago, building (237 East Ontario Street), thus altering the space entirely.

Following his 1978 project, the MCA presented two retrospectives of Matta-Clark's work, in 1985 and in 2008. The 2008 exhibition You Are the Measure included never-before-displayed archival material of his 1978 Chicago project. You Are the Measure traveled to the Whitney Museum of American Art, New York, and the Museum of Contemporary Art, Los Angeles.

Death and legacy
Matta-Clark died from pancreatic cancer on August 27, 1978, aged 35, in New York City. He was survived by his widow, Jane Crawford. The Gordon Matta-Clark Archive is housed at the Canadian Centre for Architecture, Montreal.

In 2019, his 1974 piece Splitting was cited by The New York Times as one of the 25 works of art that defined the contemporary age.

Videography
Program One: Chinatown Voyeur (1971)
Program Two (1971–1972)
Tree Dance (1971)
Open House (1972)
Program Three (1971–1975)
Fire Child (1971)
Fresh Kill (1972)
Day's End (1975)
Food (1972)
 Program Five (1972–1976)
Automation House (1972)
Clockshower (1973)
City Slivers (1976)
Program Four: Sauna View (1973)
Program Six (1974–1976)
Splitting (1974)
Bingo/Ninths (1974)
Substrait (Underground Dailies) (1976)
Program Seven (1974–2005)
Conical Intersect" (1975)Sous-Sols de Paris (Paris Underground) (1977–2005)The Wall (1976–2007)Program Eight: Office Baroque (1977–2005)

 Exhibitions 

Gordon Matta-Clark: A Retrospective, Museum of Contemporary Art, Chicago, Chicago (1985)
En chantier: The Collections of the CCA, 1989-1999, Canadian Centre for Architecture, Montreal (1999-2000)
Postmedia: Conceptual Photography in the Guggenheim Museum Collection, Guggenheim Museum, New York (2000)
out of the box: price rossi stirling + matta-clark, Canadian Centre for Architecture, Montreal (2003-2004)
 Absent Wall: Recalling Gordon Matta-Clark’s Garbage Wall (1970), Canadian Centre for Architecture, Montreal (2004)
 Odd Lots: Revisiting Gordon Matta-Clark’s Fake Estates, curated by Jefffrey Kastner, Sina Najafi, and Frances Richard, Queens Museum of Art & White Columns, New York (2005)
Open Systems: Rethinking Art c.1970, Tate Modern, London (2005)
Arrivals, Canadian Centre for Architecture, Montreal (2008)
Gordon Matta-Clark: You are the Measure, Museum of Contemporary Art, Chicago, Chicago (2008)
FORTY, MoMA PS1, New York (2016)
Gordon Matta-Clark : Anarchitecte, Galerie nationale du Jeu de Paume, Paris (2018)
 Material Thinking: Gordon Matta-Clark selected by Yann Chateigné, Canadian Centre for Architecture, Montreal (2019)
Passing Through Architecture: The 10 Years of Gordon Matta-Clark , Power Station of Art, Shanghai (2019-2020)
 Rough Cuts and Outtakes: Gordon Matta-Clark selected by Hila Peleg, Canadian Centre for Architecture, Montreal (2019-2020)
 Line of Flight: Gordon Matta-Clark selected by Kitty Scott, Canadian Centre for Architecture, Montreal (2020)

 Selected books 

 Odd Lots: Revisiting Gordon Matta-Clark’s Fake Estates,'' introduction and interviews by curators Jeffrey Kastner, Sina Najafi, and Frances Richard, Essays by Jeffrey A. Kroessler and Frances Richard (New York: Cabinet Books, 2005).

References

External links

Finding aid for the Gordon Matta-Clark Collection, Canadian Centre for Architecture (digitized items)
Gordon Matta-Clark at David Zwirner 
Selected Press at David Zwirner
Profile on Artnet.com 
EAI: Gordon Matta-Clark Biography and a list of video works by the artist

1943 births
1978 deaths
Artists from New York (state)
American people of Chilean descent
American conceptual artists
Deaths from cancer in New York (state)
Deaths from pancreatic cancer
Deconstructivism
Cornell University College of Architecture, Art, and Planning alumni
Love Canal